The 2011–12 NBA season was the 66th season of the National Basketball Association (NBA), which began with the signing of a new collective bargaining agreement (CBA) between the owners of the 30 NBA teams and the NBA's players. The previous CBA, which was ratified in 2005, expired at 12:01 AM EDT on July 1, 2011, resulting in a lockout. With the new deal in place, the regular season was shortened from the normal 82 games per team to 66, because of nearly two months of inactivity. This was the league's first season since 1991–92 without Shaquille O'Neal, who announced his retirement on June 1, 2011 via social media. A 4-time champion, O'Neal played 19 years for the Orlando Magic, Los Angeles Lakers, Miami Heat, Phoenix Suns, Cleveland Cavaliers, and Boston Celtics. The season began on Christmas Day 2011, and ended on April 26, 2012. The playoffs started on April 28 and ended on June 21 when the Miami Heat defeated the Oklahoma City Thunder in Game 5 of their series, 121–106, winning the Finals, 4–1 and to capture the franchise's second NBA title. LeBron James was named both the season MVP and the NBA Finals MVP. The NBA regular season would not begin again in December until the 2020–21 NBA season.

Transactions

Free agency
Free agency started on December 9, 2011.

Coaching changes

Off-season
On May 31, the Los Angeles Lakers hired Mike Brown as head coach, replacing Phil Jackson who retired at the end of the previous season.
On June 1, the Houston Rockets hired Kevin McHale as head coach, replacing Rick Adelman whose contract expired at the end of the previous season.
On June 6, the Golden State Warriors hired Mark Jackson as head coach, replacing Keith Smart who was fired on April 27.
On June 21, the Toronto Raptors hired Dallas Mavericks assistant coach Dwane Casey as head coach, replacing Jay Triano, whose contract as head coach expired at the end of the previous season. Triano was retained as a special assistant to the president and general manager.
On August 3, the Detroit Pistons hired Boston Celtics assistant coach Lawrence Frank as head coach, replacing John Kuester who was fired on June 5.
On September 28, the Minnesota Timberwolves hired Rick Adelman as head coach, replacing Kurt Rambis who was fired on July 12.

In-season
On January 5, the Sacramento Kings fired Paul Westphal and promoted assistant coach Keith Smart to head coach.
On January 24, the Washington Wizards fired Flip Saunders and promoted assistant coach Randy Wittman to head coach.
On March 14, the New York Knicks announced the resignation of Mike D'Antoni and promoted assistant Mike Woodson to head coach on an interim basis for the rest of the season.
On March 15, the Portland Trail Blazers fired Nate McMillan and promoted assistant Kaleb Canales as interim head coach.

2011 NBA lockout

The lockout was the fourth work stoppage in the history of the NBA. It began at UTC (12:01 am EDT) on July 1, 2011. The main issues dividing the owners and the players were revenue sharing and the structure of the salary cap. During the lockout, teams could not trade, sign or contact players and players couldn't access NBA team facilities, trainers, or staff members. All preseason games (scheduled to begin October 9) and the first six weeks of the regular season (scheduled to begin November 1, through December 15) were canceled. Some players signed contracts to play in other countries, and most had the option to return to the NBA as soon as the lockout ended. On November 26, 2011, after 15 hours of talks, a tentative deal was reached; once officially ratified, the NBA started a revised 2011–12 season. Owners allowed players to have voluntary workouts at team sites starting December 1. On December 8, 2011, the lockout ended when the owners and players ratified a new CBA agreement.

Preseason
Training camp began on December 9. A revised two-game preseason schedule took place.

Regular season
A revised 66-game regular season began on December 25, 2011, with five Christmas Day games, two more than the original schedule. The league built a new schedule from scratch based on available arena dates.  In October, the league allowed arenas in Los Angeles and Chicago to reassign NBA dates for other events. The number of games between conferences was affected as was the case in the 1999 lockout, when each team played only five or six interconference games in a 50-game schedule.  Normally, each team plays teams in the other conference twice each. Teams played 48 conference games and 18 non-conference games in a 66-game schedule, compared to 52 conference games and 30 non-conference games in a normal 82-game season. Teams played on average two more games per month and also were required to play three-consecutive games at least once in the season. In total, the league had 42 sets of back-to-back-to-back games throughout the season, with 11 teams playing two such sets. The exception was the then champion Dallas Mavericks, who never had a set of 3 consecutive back to backs. The three-game set, or "triple", also occurred during the shortened 1998–99 season, which featured 64 triples and sloppier play due to tired players. Before that, the last occurrence was two decades earlier. On 29 occasions during the season, teams played a stretch of five games in six days. With fewer off days during the season, the level of play was lower due to fatigue, and some older players rested to avoid burnout and recuperate from injuries. When the San Antonio Spurs rested Tim Duncan for a game in March at the end of a back-to-back-to-back, coach Gregg Popovich submitted the description of Duncan's injury as "Old".

Standings

By division

Eastern Conference

Western Conference

By conference

Notes
z – Clinched home court advantage for the entire playoffs
c – Clinched home court advantage for the conference playoffs
x – Clinched playoff spot
y – Clinched division title

Tiebreakers

 Chicago clinched the #1 overall seed over San Antonio based on head-to-head record (1–0).

Western Conference
 The Los Angeles Lakers clinched #3 seed over Memphis upon winning the Pacific Division.
 Dallas clinched #7 seed over Utah based on head-to-head record (3–1).

Playoffs

The 2012 NBA playoffs began on April 28, and concluded on June 21, 2012 when the Miami Heat defeated the Oklahoma City Thunder.

The Chicago Bulls were eliminated after losing Derrick Rose and Joakim Noah to injuries, and the New York Knicks lost to the Miami Heat while losing Baron Davis and Iman Shumpert to knee injuries.  The Heat were not immune, losing Chris Bosh for most of the playoffs en route to their championship. Commissioner David Stern initially said there was no connection between the injuries and the 66-game schedule compressed into 124 days; however, he backed off those comments a week later, saying more research was needed.

This season also marked the final time that Kobe Bryant appeared in the playoffs as an achilles injury the following season resulted in him not being fit enough to join the Lakers for the 2013 first round.

Bracket

Statistics leaders

Individual statistic leaders

Individual game highs

Team statistic leaders

Notable occurrences
On December 8, 2011, the New Orleans Hornets, the Los Angeles Lakers and the Houston Rockets agreed to a trade that would send Chris Paul to Los Angeles. NBA commissioner David Stern nullified the trade, saying the Hornets were better off keeping Paul than accepting the terms of the deal. The league had acquired the Hornets from former owner George Shinn, and the commissioner's office has final authority over all management decisions. Several of the other owners, who co-own the Hornets, also opposed the deal. Cleveland Cavaliers owner Dan Gilbert felt that the Lakers were acquiring the best player in the deal, Paul, and reducing their salary to possibly acquire Dwight Howard. Owners believed the trade would have sent a bad message coming out of the lockout, where one goal was to give small-market teams a chance to keep their players. Paul had long been speculated to be leaving the Hornets as a free agent after the end of the season. Magic Johnson said the trade denial "sends a bad message to fans", and Dwyane Wade called the situation a "mess". The three teams involved in the trade attempted to lobby the league to reverse its ruling as well as reconstruct the deal that would satisfy the league, only to be met by resistance from the league who wants the Hornets to receive more youth and draft picks. Later, the Lakers pulled out of the trade talk. Five days later, Paul was finally traded to the Los Angeles Clippers.
The Toronto Raptors became the first North American sports franchise to apply 3D application to its hardwood floor, which when seen by the players and in-arena spectators appears flat, but when seen by the television audience appears popped up. It made its debut in a pre-season game against the Boston Celtics at Air Canada Centre on December 18. On December 21, when the two teams met at the TD Garden, the Celtics became the first team to apply their Twitter account on their trademark parquet floor.
The Raptors also became the first NBA team to unveil camouflaged uniforms, which they wore for the first time on March 21 against the Chicago Bulls as a tribute to the Canadian Forces.
Due to a career-ending knee injury, Portland Trail Blazers guard and three-time All-Star Brandon Roy announced his retirement, after only five seasons, on December 9, 2011. Roy's retirement was brief, however, when he joined the Minnesota Timberwolves the next season.
A new shot-clock rule was put into place. Upon reaching the five-second mark, tenths of a second is displayed in order to accurately determine last-second shots.
The Conseco Fieldhouse, the arena of the Indiana Pacers was renamed to Bankers Life Fieldhouse. On December 26, 2011 they played their first game in the newly named arena against the Detroit Pistons. Likewise the Oklahoma City Thunder's arena was renamed the Chesapeake Energy Arena, after Chesapeake Energy acquired naming rights.
Final season of the Nets playing in New Jersey. They spent a total of 36 seasons  in New Jersey in four different locations (Teaneck Armory, Piscataway's Rutgers Athletic Center, East Rutherford's Izod Center (Brendan Byrne and Continental Airlines Arena), and Newark's Prudential Center) from 1977 to 2012. They are scheduled to move to Brooklyn, a borough of New York City, the next season at the Barclays Center, becoming the first "Big Four" sports franchise in Brooklyn since the Brooklyn Dodgers left in 1957.
All four active NBA teams formerly in the American Basketball Association (New Jersey Nets (as the New York Nets), San Antonio Spurs (as the Texas Chaparrals), Denver Nuggets, Indiana Pacers) along with the Minnesota Timberwolves (as the Minnesota Muskies), the Memphis Grizzlies (as the Memphis Tams), the Los Angeles Clippers (as the Los Angeles Stars), the Charlotte Bobcats (as the Carolina Cougars), and the Miami Heat (as the Miami Floridians) participated in NBA Hardwood Classics Nights as a tribute to the ABA wearing throwback jerseys.
On February 19 in an overtime win vs. the Denver Nuggets, Kevin Durant scored 51, Russell Westbrook scored 40, and Serge Ibaka had a triple-double marking the first time that a player scores 50+ points, with another scoring 40+ points, and another having a triple-double in the same game.
On March 25, the Atlanta Hawks defeat the Utah Jazz 139–133 at Philips Arena in the first quadruple-overtime game since November 14, 1997, when the Phoenix Suns defeated the Portland Trail Blazers 140–139.
On April 13, Tom Benson, who owns the NFL's New Orleans Saints, agreed to buy the Hornets from the NBA for $338 million.
On April 26, the New Jersey Nets played their last game against the Toronto Raptors before moving to Brooklyn, New York.
The Charlotte Bobcats set the single–season NBA record for the worst winning percentage, going 7–59 for a .106 winning percentage. The 1972–73 Philadelphia 76ers previously held the record with .110, but they played the typical 82–game schedule.
Kevin Durant became the seventh player to win three consecutive scoring titles, and the first since Michael Jordan notched the last scoring title of his career in the 1997–98 season.
The Philadelphia 76ers became the fifth eighth seed to defeat a top seed in the playoffs, winning the first round series in six games over the Chicago Bulls. The Bulls lost reigning MVP Derrick Rose to an ACL injury in Game 1, who consequently missed the rest of the series.

Milestones and records

Individual

December 31: 800 coaching wins – San Antonio Spurs head coach Gregg Popovich became the 14th coach to register 800 wins in a 104–89 win over the Utah Jazz, putting him second all-time behind Jerry Sloan for coaching victories with one team.
January 1: Youngest player to 28,000 points – Los Angeles Lakers guard Kobe Bryant scored his 28,000th career point in a 99–90 loss against the Denver Nuggets. Bryant was 33 years and 131 days old.
January 12: Most free throw attempts in a game. Orlando Magic center Dwight Howard attempted a regular season record 39 free throws against the Golden State Warriors, breaking Wilt Chamberlain's record of 34 set in 1962. (Shaquille O'Neal attempted 39 free throws in Game 2 of the 2000 NBA Finals.) Howard entered the game making 42 percent of his free throws for the season and just below 60 percent for his career. The Warriors fouled Howard intentionally throughout the game. Howard made 21 of the 39 attempts, and he finished with 45 points and 23 rebounds in the Magic's 117–109 victory.
January 12: Phoenix Suns point guard Steve Nash scored his 16,000th career point in a 101–90 loss at the Cleveland Cavaliers.
January 13: Dallas Mavericks power forward Dirk Nowitzki scored his 23,000th career point in a 102–72 win at the Milwaukee Bucks.
January 18: New York Knicks small forward Carmelo Anthony scored his 15,000th career point in an 88–91 loss to the Phoenix Suns.
January 20: Los Angeles Lakers power forward Pau Gasol scored his 14,000th career point in an 80–92 loss to the Orlando Magic.
January 23: Chicago Bulls shooting guard Richard Hamilton scored his 15,000th career point in a 110–95 win against the New Jersey Nets.
January 28: Los Angeles Lakers shooting guard Kobe Bryant with his 7,161st free throw broke the Lakers all-time free throw record, breaking Jerry West's record in a 100–89 loss to the Milwaukee Bucks.
January 29: Los Angeles Lakers shooting guard Kobe Bryant with his 9,936th field goal broke the Lakers all-time field goals record held by Kareem Abdul-Jabbar just one day after breaking Jerry West's team free throw record in a 106–101 win over the Minnesota Timberwolves.
February 3: Youngest player to 18,000 points – Miami Heat forward LeBron James scored his 18,000th career point in a 99–79 win against the Philadelphia 76ers. James was 28 years and 35 days old. This record was previously held by Kobe Bryant.
February 6: Bryant 5th on NBA all-time scoring list. Los Angeles Lakers shooting guard Kobe Bryant passed Shaquille O'Neal after scoring his 28,597th point during the first half of a 95–90 loss to the Philadelphia 76ers.
February 6: San Antonio Spurs power forward Tim Duncan scored his 22,000th career point in an 89–84 win against the Memphis Grizzlies.
February 10: Los Angeles Lakers shooting guard Kobe Bryant made his 10,000th career field goal in an 85–92 loss to the New York Knicks.
February 11: San Antonio Spurs point guard Tony Parker scored his 13,000th career point in a 103–89 win against the New Jersey Nets.
February 12: Washington Wizards forward Rashard Lewis scored his 15,000th career point in a 98–77 win against the Detroit Pistons.
February 20: Nowitzki 20th on NBA all-time scoring list. Dallas Mavericks forward Dirk Nowitzki passed Robert Parish after scoring his 23,335th point during the second half of an 89–73 victory to the Boston Celtics.
February 20: Kidd 2nd on the NBA all-time steals list. Dallas Mavericks point guard Jason Kidd recorded career steal 2,515 to move past Michael Jordan.
March 4: Boston Celtics small forward Paul Pierce scored his 22,000th career point in a 115–111 win against the New York Knicks.
March 4: New Jersey Nets franchise record: most points in a game. Deron Williams scored 57 in a 104–101 win against the Charlotte Bobcats.
March 9: Youngest player to 29,000 points. Los Angeles Lakers shooting guard Kobe Bryant scored his 29,000th career point in a 105–102 victory against the Minnesota Timberwolves. Bryant was 33 years and 200 days old. This record was previously held by Wilt Chamberlain.
March 17: Boston Celtics power forward Kevin Garnett made his 5,000th assist in a 98–91 loss against the Denver Nuggets.
March 19: Chicago Bulls' Tom Thibodeau became the fastest coach in NBA history to earn 100 career victories, doing so on his 130th game as a head coach.
March 20: Phoenix Suns small forward Grant Hill scored his 17,000th career point in a 95–99 loss against the Miami Heat.
March 22: Pierce 26th on the NBA all-time scoring list. Boston Celtics small forward Paul Pierce passes Clyde Drexler in a 100–91 win against the Milwaukee Bucks.
March 23: Minnesota Timberwolves franchise record; most points in a game. Kevin Love scored 51 in a 140–149 double-overtime loss to the Oklahoma City Thunder.
March 24: Nowitzki 19th on the NBA all-time scoring list. Dallas Mavericks power forward Dirk Nowitzki passed Charles Barkley for 19th on all-time scoring list after scoring his 23,758 point in a 101–99 victory over the Houston Rockets.
March 27: Bryant 2nd on the all-time list of points scored for a single franchise: Los Angeles Lakers shooting guard Kobe Bryant passed Michael Jordan for second most points scored by a player for a single franchise after scoring 30 points in a 104–101 victory over the Golden State Warriors.
March 31: Cleveland Cavaliers power/small forward Antawn Jamison scored his 19,000th career point in a 75–91 loss to the New York Knicks.
April 2: Los Angeles Clippers franchise record: most 3-pointers in a game. Los Angeles Clippers shooting guard Randy Foye has scored 8 3-pointers in a game in a 94–75 win over the Dallas Mavericks.
April 11: San Antonio Spurs shooting guard Manu Ginóbili scored his 10,000 career point in an 84–98 loss to the Los Angeles Lakers.
April 15: Dallas Mavericks power forward Dirk Nowitzki scored his 24,000th career point in a 108–112 loss to the Los Angeles Lakers.
April 19: Miami Heat small forward LeBron James scored his 19,000th career point in an 83–72 win against the Chicago Bulls.
April 21: Nash 5th on the NBA all-time assist list. Phoenix Suns point guard Steve Nash passed Oscar Robertson for 5th on all time assist list after passing his 9,888th assist in a 107–118 loss against the Denver Nuggets.
April 23: Memphis Grizzlies franchise record: Most steals in a game: Memphis Grizzlies shooting guard Tony Allen made the most steals in franchise history in a game with eight in a 104–99 win over the Cleveland Cavaliers.
April 26: NBA Record: Phoenix Suns shooting guard Josh Childress broke the record for the most minutes played in one season without making a free throw with 491 minutes played this season.

Team
April 26: NBA Record: Charlotte Bobcats set the record for worst winning percentage in a season at 0.106 (7–59), surpassing the record previously held by the 1972–73 Philadelphia 76ers.  In doing so, they also set a record for worst home winning percentage at 0.121 (4–29), beating out the record previously held by the 1947–48 Providence Steamrollers.
April 26: NBA Record: San Antonio Spurs finish the season with a 50–16 record, in doing so they won at least 50 games for the 13th straight season.

Awards

Yearly awards
Most Valuable Player: LeBron James, Miami Heat
Defensive Player of the Year: Tyson Chandler, New York Knicks
Rookie of the Year: Kyrie Irving, Cleveland Cavaliers
Sixth Man of the Year: James Harden, Oklahoma City Thunder
Most Improved Player: Ryan Anderson, Orlando Magic
Coach of the Year: Gregg Popovich, San Antonio Spurs
Executive of the Year: Larry Bird, Indiana Pacers
Sportsmanship Award: Jason Kidd, Dallas Mavericks
J. Walter Kennedy Citizenship Award: Pau Gasol, Los Angeles Lakers

All-NBA First Team:
 F LeBron James, Miami Heat
 F Kevin Durant, Oklahoma City Thunder
 C Dwight Howard, Orlando Magic
 G Kobe Bryant, Los Angeles Lakers
 G Chris Paul, Los Angeles Clippers

All-NBA Second Team:
 F Kevin Love, Minnesota Timberwolves
 F Blake Griffin, Los Angeles Clippers
 C Andrew Bynum, Los Angeles Lakers
 G Tony Parker, San Antonio Spurs
 G Russell Westbrook, Oklahoma City Thunder

All-NBA Third Team:
 F Carmelo Anthony, New York Knicks
 F Dirk Nowitzki, Dallas Mavericks
 C Tyson Chandler, New York Knicks
 G Dwyane Wade, Miami Heat
 G Rajon Rondo, Boston Celtics

NBA All-Defensive First Team:
 F LeBron James, Miami Heat
 F Serge Ibaka, Oklahoma City Thunder
 C Dwight Howard, Orlando Magic
 G Chris Paul, Los Angeles Clippers
 G Tony Allen, Memphis Grizzlies

NBA All-Defensive Second Team:
 F Kevin Garnett, Boston Celtics
 F Luol Deng, Chicago Bulls
 C Tyson Chandler, New York Knicks
 G Rajon Rondo, Boston Celtics
 G Kobe Bryant, Los Angeles Lakers

NBA All-Rookie First Team:
 Kyrie Irving, Cleveland Cavaliers
 Ricky Rubio, Minnesota Timberwolves
 Kenneth Faried, Denver Nuggets
 Klay Thompson, Golden State Warriors
 Kawhi Leonard, San Antonio Spurs
 Iman Shumpert, New York Knicks
 Brandon Knight, Detroit Pistons

NBA All-Rookie Second Team:
 Isaiah Thomas, Sacramento Kings
 MarShon Brooks, New Jersey Nets
 Chandler Parsons, Houston Rockets
 Tristan Thompson, Cleveland Cavaliers
 Derrick Williams, Minnesota Timberwolves

Players of the week
The following players were named the Eastern and Western Conference Players of the Week.

Players of the month
The following players were named the Eastern and Western Conference Players of the Month.

Rookies of the month
The following players were named the Eastern and Western Conference Rookies of the Month.

Coaches of the month
The following coaches were named the Eastern and Western Conference Coaches of the Month.

Community Assist Award
The following players won the Community Assist Award.

References

External links

 
NBA
2011–12 in Canadian basketball